Oru CBI Diary Kurippu is a 1988 Indian Malayalam-language mystery thriller film directed by K. Madhu, written by S. N. Swamy, and starring Mammootty, Suresh Gopi, Jagathy Sreekumar, Mukesh, and Sukumaran. The lead character, CBI officer Sethurama Iyer is inspired by a police officer named Radha Vinod Raju, Jammu and Kashmir cadre IPS Officer who in 2009 was appointed as the first chief of India's National Investigation Agency. It was the highest grossing Malayalam film at that time. Considered one of the best crime thrillers in Malayalam, it eventually developed a cult following. This is the first instalment in the CBI film series featuring Mammootty as Sethurama Iyer.

It was produced by M. Mani under the banner Sunitha Productions. Sequels to the film are Jagratha (1989), Sethurama Iyer CBI (2004),  Nerariyan CBI (2005), and CBI 5: The Brain (2022). The film was remade in Telugu as Nyayam Kosam with Rajasekhar and in Hindi as Police Public with Raaj Kumar. Oru CBI Diary Kuripp ran for a whole year (365 days) in Tamil Nadu at a time when Malayalam films did not find much of an audience in the neighbouring states.

Plot

Omana’s body is found on the grounds behind her house. It seems that she committed suicide by flinging herself from the roof of the house onto the stone pavement below. The case is being investigated by SP Prabhakara Varma IPS who is an honest police officer. He is assisted by Circle Inspector Alex. The cops interrogates Omana's husband Sunny, her father-in-law Ouseppachan, a local businessman, Ouseppachan's best friend Narayan, household servants and neighbours. Sunny admits to arguing with Omana previous night and pushing her onto their bed before leaving to drink, but swears he never hit her. He also tells Varma that Omana had attempted suicide before. Ouseppachan claims that he came home from a business trip that night, dropped off by his driver, Vasu, only to find himself locked out of the house. He decided to go around the back to where the cook's quarters were located when he stumbled upon Omana's body. Dissatisfied with inconsistent testimonies from several suspects, Police suspects foul play. However, the Regional Medical Officer reports that Omana died from head trauma at 8:00 P.M.

Omana's cousin Chacko, a constable, notices Ouseppachan commending one of the servants for something suspicious. He also finds the autopsy report suspicious and tells higher officials Varma and Alex why he has doubts about its accuracy. He informs them that it rained severely until 9:30 P.M. Omana allegedly committed suicide, and if she had died at 8:00 P.M., her corpse would have been wet, and the blood from her injury would have been mixed in with the rainwater. Alex, who is taking bribes from Ouseppachan, warns Ouseppachan to do what he can to get Varma and Chacko off the case. Sensing that Varma will cause him trouble, Ouseppachan implores his best friend, Narayanan, to call his politician friends to have Varma transferred off the case. They also managed to take Omana's cousin, Chacko off the case as well. Varma gets posted as the rural SP, whereas Chacko gets transferred to the traffic police. A new cop named DYSP Devadas takes over the case, who is also being bribed by Ouseppachan, intimidates Omana's grieving family and any witnesses that may implicate Ouseppachan or Sunny. He quickly concludes the investigation by stating that Omana committed suicide.

Omana's father Thomachan and her sister Annie are determined to seek justice for Omana. take the case to the CBI with the help of Chacko. The Director of the CBI assigns Sethurama Iyer, Deputy Superintendent to head the investigation. He is assisted by CI Harry and SI Vikram. Iyer and his team commence the investigation and find evidence of political interference in the investigation, an increased amount of phone calls to Ministers and Party Leaders from Narayanan's phone number and 1000 rupees worth of cash withdrawals from Ouseppachan's bank that were never reported in the books. Iyer meets with Varma and Chacko who help him with his investigation by informing him of inconsistent testimony from suspects and the inconsistencies with the Regional Medical Examiner's autopsy report. Later, Iyer and his team bring two dummies with the same height and weight as Omana to Ouseppachan's house.

They drop one straight down from the roof, as if it jumped, and threw the other off the roof as if someone had thrown the body. They find that Omana's body landed approximately the same place as the dummy that was thrown, and concluded that she could not have jumped that far off the roof on her own. They decide to track down Ouseppachan's driver, Vasu, who has been missing since the morning after Omana's death. Harry finds out that Vasu had given some jewellery as collateral for a loan to a local bank. Among the jewellery was a bracelet belonging to Omana. They finally find him and where he confesses that on the night of Omana's death, shortly after he got home after dropping off Ouseppachan, Narayanan came to his house and told him that Sunny had accidentally killed Omana during a domestic dispute. Narayanan and the others implored him to carry Omana's body from her bed to the roof and fling her off. It was during a moment alone with Omana's dead body that Vasu had noticed her gold bracelet and decided to steal it, before throwing her corpse off the roof.

Despite Vasu's testimony implicating Sunny as the killer, Iyer is not convinced. Sunny had left the house at 8:00 PM after hitting Omana and that would mean that she died at 8:00 PM. However, Iyer examines photographs of the crime scene and finds that Omana still bled when she was dropped off the roof some 2 hours later, and since dead bodies do not retain heat thus causing the blood to clot, she could not have died at 8 pm. Upon scrutinizing the photographs further, Iyer notices a small bloodstain on Omana's saree below the waist. Since the autopsy report stated that she sustained no injuries below the waist, Iyer is convinced that the blood was left behind by the real killer. The blood test reveals that it is O-negative, a rare blood type. Remembering that the town had imposed mandatory blood tests on all its citizens recently by the local authorities to combat malaria, Iyer goes to the Malaria Research Centre and finds that the blood type was so rare that only three people in the entire town had it.

Iyer arrives at Ouseppachan's house with a large police backup unit and places Ouseppachan under arrest for the murder of Omana. Ouseppachan vehemently denies killing her. Seeing his father being arrested for a crime he committed, a guilt-ridden Sunny confesses to Iyer that he killed Omana accidentally by hitting her too hard when they fought. Iyer tells Sunny that Omana did not die when he hit her, that she only fainted. Iyer then goes on to explain the blood on Omana's saree, which did not match her own, was left behind by the real killer. He informs them that only three people in the entire town were O-negative and one of those three people is Johny, Ouseppachan's son-in-law. Confronted with evidence for his involvement, Johny confesses that he had come to the house the night Omana had died. Finding her passed out on the bed, he attempted to rape her, but when she woke up and started screaming, he suffocated her to death. In the process, he had accidentally cut himself and left his blood on her saree.

Cast

Production

Inspiration 
 
The lead character, CBI officer Sethurama Iyer is inspired by a police officer named Radha Vinod Raju, Jammu and Kashmir cadre IPS Officer who in 2009 was appointed as the first chief of India's National Investigation Agency.  Raju's excellence while probing the Polakulam Peethambaran murder case and SI Soman murder case, when he was acting as Superintend of CBI Kochi, attracted the attention of many. Incidentally, Raju was Mammootty's senior in Maharajas College.

Characterization 
Mammootty's Sethurama Iyer was initially conceived as a rough and tough Muslim character, Ali Imran, but Mammootty suggested an Iyer character to incorporate jibes of Devadas (Sukumaran) about vegetarianism and lack of Iyers to do physical work. This resulted in one of the most popular two-character confrontation scenes between Sethurama Iyer (Mammootty) and Devadas (Sukumaran). Due to its popularity, this was repeated in the sequels Jagratha and Sethurama Iyer CBI. The third sequel was released 15 years after Jagratha. By this time, Sukumaran, who had portrayed Devadas, had passed away. Thus, Sai Kumar was cast as the son of Devadas; he was required to mimic Sukumaran's style of performance.

Writing 
The film concentrates on the central investigative story only, without the songs and dances generally associated with Indian commercial films.The plot-line of the film was crafted around the real-life Polakkulam Case in which a hotel employee was murdered and dropped from the terrace to make it look like a suicide. It was also the first case where a humanoid dummy experiment was conducted in the state of Kerala to prove the murder.

Reception

Critical Response 
In a retrospect review, TheNewsMinute states that: "It is amazing how tightly made the movie is. K Madhu, the director, packs a whole lot into the film, 2 hours and 10 minutes long. It has three investigations of the same crime, the first honest one by Varma, the second by a corrupt officer called Devadas and the third by Iyer and team. In between are the past stories that make Omana a real person you empathise with and feel for. On the other side, you also see the corruption happening so casually, the money that goes from hand to hand to hush up the crimes of the rich and influential." They further state: "His character is very clearly written out. He is not the one to go sniffing for clues and chase villains on the road. He stands back and lets the provocations pass, stopping one of his juniors from jumping walls to counter attack a threat. He does not ever use a disguise, preferring to introduce himself with his real name and designation every time. To his juniors – Vikram, played by Jagathy Sreekumar, and Harry, played by Suresh Gopi – he is never too friendly, but not bossy either." They then state: "With that curious mix of everything, K Madhu set off a new trend of detective movies with Oru CBI Diary Kurippu. Malayalam cinema had ‘CBI’ movies before, with Prem Nazir and Adoor Bhasi playing colleagues in disguise. But the Sethurama Iyer series adopted a new approach, building a narrative for you to empathise with the victim while using cinematic elements as punch lines and background music to enliven the solving of the crime. Even as the detective meant strictly business, personalised the story he went after."

Box office 
The film was made on a shoestring budget of only 37 Lakhs. Oru CBI Diary Kurippu was a blockbuster at the box office. The film ran for more than 50 days in all release centres. The film collected 15 Lakhs in 151 days from two centers in Thiruvanthapuram. This was the first time a film ran for four weeks, regular shows in two theatres. The film collected 14 Lakhs from centers in Ernakulam. The film was also a huge success in the neighboring state of Tamil Nadu and ran for more than 300 days in Safire Theatre, Madras. The film grossed 54 Lakhs at the Tamil Nadu box office.

Remakes
The film was remade into Telugu as Nyayam Kosam in 1988. The film was directed by Ravi Raja Pinisetty and starred Rajasekhar. The film was again remade in Hindi as Police Public in 1990. The film was directed by Esmayeel Shroff and starred Raaj Kumar as CBI Officer Jagmohan Azaad.

Legacy
The film is considered one of the best investigative thrillers in Malayalam cinema. The film introduced the character of Sethurama Iyer who has now become one the most iconic characters in Malayalam cinema. The signature pose, slang and theme music of Sethurama Iyer are now iconic. The film is also considered a milestone in the Malayalam film industry as it was the first Malayalam film to run in Tamil Nadu for over a year. Malayalam films never performed well in Tamil Nadu; It was a time when B-grade Malayalam films were the only films that performed well in states other than Kerala. The success of the film spawned a series of unrelated investigative thriller films in the late 80's and early 90's. Notable films include films like: Utharam, Ee Thanutha Veluppan Kalathu, Mukham e. 

Renu Saran in her book, History of Indian Cinema wrote, "Then came Oru CBI Diary Kurrippu, which was sort of a landmark, in Malayalam cinema. It bought to fore a new concept of villainy and a refreshing idea of a hero. Without even a single song or dance number, Oru CBI Diary Kurrippu created box-office history in Kerala." 

Oru CBI Diary Kurippu gave a break for Janardhanan who appeared in a comical role, Ouseppachan, until then, he was known for portraying antagonistic roles. He began appearing in more comedic roles after Oru CBI Diary Kurippu and would be best known for his comedic roles in the later half of his career.

References

External links
 
 Polakkulam murder case

1988 films
1980s Malayalam-language films
Films scored by Shyam (composer)
Indian sequel films
CBIDiary1
1980s mystery thriller films
Indian mystery thriller films
Fictional portrayals of the Kerala Police
Films shot in Thiruvananthapuram
Malayalam films remade in other languages
Films with screenplays by S. N. Swamy
Central Bureau of Investigation in fiction
Films directed by K. Madhu